Kelan Antep is traditional dish from Jepara City, Central Java, Indonesia.

Ingredients
Kelan Antep is prepared using lean meat (beef, lamb or goat), water, garlic, red onion, red pepper, tamarind, galangal, and bay leaf. It can be served as a side dish or as a vegetable soup.

References

Indonesian cuisine